Alexander Williams Biddle (April 29, 1819 – May 2, 1899) was an American businessman from Pennsylvania.  He was a member of the prominent and wealthy Biddle family and grandson of American Revolutionary War soldier Clement Biddle.  He served as an officer in the Union Army during the American Civil War and fought in some of the key battles of the war.

Early life and education
Biddle was born on April 29, 1819 in Philadelphia, Pennsylvania to Thomas A. and Christine Williams Biddle.

He received his early education from the school of Sears C. Walker in Philadelphia.  He entered the University of Pennsylvania in 1834 and graduated in 1838. After graduation he worked for the Bevan and Humphreys shipping firm in Philadelphia until 1842.  In 1848, he joined his father's company, Thomas Biddle & Co., where he worked until the beginning of the Civil War.

Civil war
In 1849, he joined the first troop of the Philadelphia City Cavalry in which he served until 1858.

On September 1, 1862 he joined the 121st Pennsylvania Volunteer Infantry and served under his cousin Chapman Biddle.  He served successively as a Major, Lieutenant Colonel and Colonel.  He fought at the Battle of Fredericksburg, the Battle of Chancellorsville, the Battle of Gettysburg (under Abner Doubleday) and the Battle of Bristoe Station.

His name is inscribed on the 121st Pennsylvania's monument along South Reynolds Avenue in the Gettysburg National Military Park.

Business career
After the war he retired from Thomas Biddle & Company, and in 1874 he was named a director of the Pennsylvania Railroad. He also served as a director for the Philadelphia Savings Fund Company, the Pennsylvania Company for Insurance on Lives and Granting Annuities, the Lehigh Navigation Company and the Contributionship Insurance Company.  He served as president of the Board of City Trusts and as a member of the board of managers of the Pennsylvania Hospital. He was an executor of the estate of James Rush (1786–1869) and was instrumental in the construction of the Ridgway Library (part of the Library Company of Philadelphia).

Personal life
In 1855 he married Julia Williams Rush, the granddaughter of Benjamin Rush, and together they had seven children.

He was member of the American Philosophical Society, the Franklin Institute, the Academy of Natural Sciences and the Pennsylvania Society Sons of the Revolution.

He died on May 2, 1899 in Philadelphia and was interred at Laurel Hill Cemetery.

See also

 Biddle family

References

External links

1819 births
1899 deaths
American bankers
Alexander
Burials at Laurel Hill Cemetery (Philadelphia)
Businesspeople from Philadelphia
Cornell family
Members of the American Philosophical Society
Military personnel from Philadelphia
Pennsylvania Railroad people
People of Pennsylvania in the American Civil War
Union Army officers
University of Pennsylvania alumni